Montour County is a county in the Commonwealth of Pennsylvania. It is located in Northeastern Pennsylvania. As of the 2020 census, the population was 18,136. Its county seat is Danville. The county is named for Andrew Montour, a prominent Métis interpreter who served with George Washington during the French and Indian War. It encompasses 132 sq mi, making it the smallest county by land area in the state.

Montour County is part of the Bloomsburg-Berwick, PA Metropolitan Statistical Area.

History
Fort Bosley, located near the present day border of Derry Township and the Borough of Washingtonville, was the county's only fortified location during the Revolutionary War.

Geography
It is the smallest county by area in Pennsylvania. A total of 45% of Montour County is wooded. The entire county sits inside the Susquehanna River watershed. The other major streams in Montour County include Chillisquaque Creek and Mahoning Creek.

Climate
Montour has a humid continental climate (Dfa/Dfb) and average monthly temperatures in Danville range from 26.9 °F in January to 72.3 °F in July.

Adjacent counties
Lycoming County (north)
Columbia County (east)
Northumberland County (south & west)

Major highways

Geology

Montour County is located in the Ridge-and-Valley Province of the Appalachian Mountains. A total of 65% of the soils in the county are well-drained. The Muncy Hills are located in the northern part of the county and Montour Ridge is located in the southern part of the county, not far from the Susquehanna River. Montour Ridge also is home to the highest elevation in the county, 1425 feet above sea level. The lowest elevation is 440 feet above sea level, at the Susquehanna River.

The sedimentary rocks in Montour County are from either the Devonian Period or the Silurian Period. The Devonian Period rocks are more common than Silurian Period rocks, making up two thirds of the county. These rocks are prevalent in the Muncy Hills and the lowlands in the southern portion of the county. The Devonian Period rocks in Montour County include the Catskill Formation, the Marcellus Shale, the Helderburg Formation, the Mahantango Formation, the Oriskany Formation, the Marine Beds, and the Onondaga Formation. The other one third of the rocks in Montour County are from the Silurian Period. Rocks from this period are prevalent on Montour Ridge and the adjacent valley and the hills to the northwest of Washingtonville. These areas consist of the Wills Creek formation, the Tonoloway Formation, the Bloomsburg Formation, the Tuscarora Formation, the Clinton Group, and the McKenzie Formation.

There are three major anticlines and synclines in Montour County. These are the White Deer Anticline, the Lackawanna Syncline, and the Milton Anticline. These are located in the northern, central, and Montour Ridge areas of the county, respectively. These features are situated in a northeast–southwest alignment. They were formed by regional compression and uplift approximately 200 million years ago, during the Permian Period. During the Pleistocene Period, the Illinoian glacial advance reached Montour County, although the Wisconsin glacial advance stopped slightly short of it. There are alluvial deposits in many of the river valleys in the county, especially there two streams or rivers meet. These deposits were formed fairly recently, geologically speaking.

The water supply for Montour County comes primarily from the Susquehanna River, as well as wells and springs. The rural areas especially depend on wells for their water supply, but Danville mostly uses the Susquehanna River. Wells drilled into Silurian rock have a tendency to be highly hard and prone to developing sinkholes. However, the Keyser, Wills Creek, and Tonoloway Formations are considerably better at producing water.

Demographics

As of the census of 2000, there were 18,236 people, 7,085 households, and 4,817 families residing in the county. The population density was 140 people per square mile (54/km2). There were 7,627 housing units at an average density of 58 per square mile (23/km2). The racial makeup of the county was 96.67% White, 1.01% Black or African American, 0.07% Native American, 1.28% Asian, 0.38% from other races, and 0.59% from two or more races. 0.92% of the population were Hispanic or Latino of any race. 33.2% were of German, 13.2% American, 8.1% Irish, 6.6% English, 5.7% Italian and 5.6% Polish ancestry.

There were 7,085 households, out of which 30.00% had children under the age of 18 living with them, 56.30% were married couples living together, 8.90% had a female householder with no husband present, and 32.00% were non-families. 28.00% of all households were made up of individuals, and 12.00% had someone living alone who was 65 years of age or older. The average household size was 2.43 and the average family size was 2.98.

In Montour County, the population was spread out, with 24.40% under the age of 18, 6.40% from 18 to 24, 28.20% from 25 to 44, 24.00% from 45 to 64, and 17.10% who were 65 years of age or older. The median age was 40 years. For every 100 females, there were 90.50 males. For every 100 females age 18 and over, there were 86.00 males.

2020 Census

Metropolitan Statistical Area
The United States Office of Management and Budget has designated Montour County as the Bloomsburg-Berwick, PA Metropolitan Statistical Area (MSA). As of the 2010 U.S. Census the metropolitan area ranked 20th most populous in the State of Pennsylvania and the 368th most populous in the United States with a population of 82,562. Montour County is also a part of the larger Bloomsburg-Berwick-Sunbury, PA Combined Statistical Area (CSA), which combines the populations of Montour County as well as Columbia, Northumberland, Snyder and Union Counties in Pennsylvania. The Combined Statistical Area ranked 8th in the State of Pennsylvania and 115th most populous in the United States with a population of 264,739.

Economy
There are approximately 350 farms in Montour County. The majority of these farms produce beef, hogs, and dairy. Limestone is mined in some areas in the county.

Government

|}

Montour County is heavily Republican, with the Republican winning it in every presidential election since 1968.

The county is run by three locally elected commissioners, each of whose term of office lasts for four years.

State Senate
 John R. Gordner, Republican, Pennsylvania's 27th Senatorial District

State House of Representatives
 Kurt A. Masser, Republican, Pennsylvania's 107th Representative District

United States House of Representatives
 Dan Meuser, Republican, Pennsylvania's 9th congressional district

United States Senate
 Pat Toomey, Republican
 Bob Casey, Jr., Democrat

Education

Central Susquehanna Intermediate Unit #16 provides a wide variety of services to children living in Montour County. These include early intervention, special education support services, driver education on road training, speech and hearing therapy and autistic support.  Services for children during the preschool years are provided without cost to their families when the child is determined to meet eligibility requirements.

Danville Area Head Start

Public school districts
 Danville Area School District (also in Northumberland County)
 Warrior Run School District (also in Northumberland and Union Counties)

Private schools
As reported by the Pennsylvania Department of Education - EdNA. February 2014

Alternative Education Program - Danville
Breezy Meadow - Danville 
Chillisquaque Valley Parochial School - Bloomsburg
County Line Parochial School - Danville
Creek Side School - Turbotville
Danville Child Development Center - Danville
Danville Mennonite School - Danville
Delong Alternative Educ Program - Washingtonville
Limestone Mennonite Parochial School - Milton
Ridgeview Amish School - Watsontown
St Cyril Kindergarten - Danville
St Joseph School - Danville
The Learning Tree Child Care Center, LLC - Danville

CSIU16 School Directory 2014

Library
Thomas Beaver Free Library - Danville

Communities

Under Pennsylvania law, there are four types of incorporated municipalities: cities, boroughs, townships, and, in one case, towns. The following boroughs and townships are located in Montour County:

Boroughs
Danville (county seat)
Washingtonville

Townships

Anthony Township
Cooper Township
Derry Township
Liberty Township
Limestone Township
Mahoning Township
Mayberry Township
Valley Township
West Hemlock Township

Unincorporated communities
 Exchange
 Kaseville
 Limestoneville
 Mausdale
 Mechanicsville
 Mexico
 Mooresburg
 Ottawa
 Ridgeville

Population ranking
The population ranking of the following table is based on the 2010 census of Montour County.

† county seat

See also
 National Register of Historic Places listings in Montour County, Pennsylvania

References

 
1850 establishments in Pennsylvania
Populated places established in 1850
Bloomsburg–Berwick metropolitan area
Counties of Appalachia